Variospora aurantia is a species of lichen belonging to the family Teloschistaceae. In Sicily, it has been reported as a host for the lichenicolous fungus species Muellerella lichenicola.

References

Teloschistales
Lichen species
Lichens described in 1794
Taxa named by Christiaan Hendrik Persoon